Kezhemsky District is an administrative and municipal district (raion), one of the forty-three in Krasnoyarsk Krai, Russia. It is located in the east of the krai and borders with Evenkiysky District in the north, Irkutsk Oblast in the east and south, and with Boguchansky District in the west. Its administrative center is the town of Kodinsk. Population:  The population of Kodinsk accounts for 67.2% of the district's total population.

History
The district was founded on July 4, 1928.

Government
As of 2013, the Head of the District and the Chairman of the District Council is Pavel F. Bezmaternykh.

References

Notes

Sources

Districts of Krasnoyarsk Krai
States and territories established in 1928